Rose Hill Farm is a home and farm located near Upperville, Loudoun County, Virginia.  The original section of the house was built about 1820, and is -story, five bay, gable roofed brick dwelling in the Federal style. The front facade features an elaborate two-story porch with cast-iron decoration in a grape-vine pattern that was added possibly in the 1850s. Also on the property are the contributing -story, brick former slave quarters / smokehouse / dairy (c. 1820); one-story, log meat house; frame octagonal icehouse; -story, three-bay, gable-roofed, stone granary (1850s); a 19th-century, arched. stone bridge; family cemetery; and 19th century stone wall.

It was listed on the National Register of Historic Places in 1994.

References

Houses on the National Register of Historic Places in Virginia
Farms on the National Register of Historic Places in Virginia
Federal architecture in Virginia
Houses completed in 1820
Houses in Loudoun County, Virginia
National Register of Historic Places in Loudoun County, Virginia
Slave cabins and quarters in the United States